Cătunu may refer to several villages in Romania:

 Cătunu, a village in Cornești, Dâmbovița
 Cătunu, a village in Sălcioara, Dâmbovița
 Cătunu, a village in Berceni, Prahova
 Cătunu, a village in Drajna Commune, Prahova County
 Cătunu, a village in Poeni, Teleorman